The men's 400 metres event at the 1999 European Athletics U23 Championships was held in Göteborg, Sweden, at Ullevi on 29, 30, and 31 July 1999.

Medalists

Results

Final
31 July

Semifinals
30 July
Qualified: first 4 in each to the Final

Semifinal 1

Semifinal 2

Heats
29 July
Qualified: first 3 in each heat and 4 best to the Semifinal

Heat 1

Heat 2

Heat 3

Heat 4

Participation
According to an unofficial count, 31 athletes from 20 countries participated in the event.

 (1)
 (1)
 (2)
 (3)
 (3)
 (1)
 (1)
 (1)
 (1)
 (1)
 (1)
 (1)
 (3)
 (1)
 (1)
 (3)
 (2)
 (1)
 (2)
 (1)

References

400 metres
400 metres at the European Athletics U23 Championships